The Global Interdependence Center (GIC) is a Philadelphia-based non-profit organization that holds conferences and programming to increase global dialogue and promote free trade, in order to improve cooperation and understanding among nation states, with the goal of reducing international conflicts and improving worldwide living standards.

History 
The GIC was founded in 1976 during Philadelphia's Bicentennial Celebration at convocation of leading United Nations and U.S. officials. Its vision was affirmed in a Declaration of Interdependence, which was crafted by historian Henry Steele Commager and signed by international dignitaries. Early leaders in the organization included Nobel Laureate Dr. Lawrence Klein, Benjamin Franklin Professor of Economics and Finance at the University of Pennsylvania.

Notable Programming 
GIC hosts and sponsors many programs throughout the year, both in Philadelphia, where it is based, and abroad. Programming comprises international trips, domestic conferences and roundtable discussions.  Included among these programs are:

Annual Monetary and Trade Conference:  This gathering together of global leaders has been held since 1979.   Past speakers include Paul Volcker, chair of the International Accounting Standards Board and former chairman of the Board of Governors of the Federal Reserve System, Lawrence Kudlow and Robert Hormats, noted free-market economists, as well as chief economists for the International Monetary Fund and representatives from global finance and trade organizations.

The Central Banking Series:  This series assembles well-known bankers to speak on their countries' monetary policies, their views on U.S. economics and the business ramifications of monetary systems.  Recent speakers have included Christian Noyer, governor of the Banque de France and Richard Fisher, president of the Federal Reserve Bank of Dallas.

GIC Abroad: Delegations have visited France, Ireland, Estonia, Chile, South Africa and Israel. Delegations generally include business leaders from the United States as well as representatives from central banks of various nations.

Celebration of Interdependence: Formerly the Annual Black Tie Gala, the annual Celebration in Philadelphia sees the presentation of the Global Citizen Award to individuals who demonstrate exceptional service to the increasingly global community. Recent honorees include Anthony Santomero, former president of the Philadelphia Federal Reserve Bank, in 2005, Michael Heavener, executive vice president and head of Wachovia Bank's Global Financial Institution and Trade Division, in 2006, Dr. Constantine Papadakis, president of Drexel University, in 2007, Edward G. Boehne, former president of the Philadelphia Federal Reserve Bank, in 2008, and long-time Board Members Sharon Javie and Bill Dunkelberg in 2012. In addition, Dr. Roger W. Ferguson Jr., president and CEO of TIAA-CREF, was awarded the Fred Heldring Global Leadership Award in 2006.

Recent Programming 

 and

References

External links 
 Company Website
 Global Interdepence Center at Condé Nast Portfolio

Charities based in Pennsylvania
Conferences in the United States